Osmorhiza aristata (Chinese: 香根芹, Japanese: 藪人参) is a perennial plant belonging to the genus Osmorhiza, in the family Apiaceae. It is native to East Asia.

Description 
The stems are upright, reaching a height of 25 to 70 cm, and the leaves, which are oval and have serrated edges, are 7 to 30 cm long.

The flowering season is from April to July, and it is pollinated by insects. The seeds of the perennial plant ripen from June to July.

Distribution 
The plant is endemic to Eastern Asia, particularly China, Korea and Japan, where it grows on the sides of mountains and stream banks at elevations between 200 and 3500 meters, shaded by bushes and other plants.

References 

aristata